The 1932–33 Sheffield Shield season was the 37th season of the Sheffield Shield, the domestic first-class cricket competition of Australia. New South Wales won the championship.

Table

Statistics

Most Runs
Don Bradman 600

Most Wickets
Clarrie Grimmett 43

References

Sheffield Shield
Sheffield Shield
Sheffield Shield seasons